HMS Edinburgh was a  light cruiser of the Royal Navy, which served during the Second World War. She was one of the last two Town class cruisers, which formed the Edinburgh sub-class. Edinburgh saw a great deal of combat service during the Second World War, especially in the North Sea and the Arctic Sea, where she was sunk by torpedoes in 1942.

Construction and specifications 
Edinburgh was built in Newcastle-upon-Tyne by Swan Hunter and Wigham Richardson, her keel laid down on 30 December 1936.
.

The ship was heavily armed for a light cruiser, with twelve 6 inch guns, twelve (later eight) 4 inch anti-aircraft (AA) guns (along with her sister ship, the heaviest 4-in battery among all the British cruisers), sixteen 2-pounder pom pom guns, in addition to sixteen Vickers .50 machine guns.  Also, she carried six 21 inch (533 mm) torpedoes in a pair of triple racks, giving the ship extra firepower.

Edinburgh was designed as a very modern vessel, equipped with an impressive radar array and fire-control systems, and the ability to carry up to three Supermarine Walrus seaplanes for reconnaissance, though she usually carried only two.

As with battlecruisers, light cruisers were intended to be fast enough to avoid engagements with more heavily armed opponents, negating the need for immensely thick armour like that found on the battleships of the day.

War service 

Edinburgh was launched on 31 March 1938, and after commissioning in July 1939 was immediately attached to the 18th Cruiser Squadron at Scapa Flow, in Scotland, as part of the British Home Fleet. For a time, she was assigned to patrol between Iceland and the Faroe Islands, but in 1939, she was transferred to the 2nd Cruiser Squadron, serving with the Humber Force.

However, Edinburgh was still in the Firth of Forth when the Luftwaffe made their first raid on the naval bases at Rosyth on 16 October 1939. She sustained minor damage from the attack, but no direct hits. Between the three ships damaged in the raid including Edinburgh,  the cruiser , and destroyer ; sixteen Royal Navy crew died and a further 44 were wounded, although this information was not made public at the time.

She left Rosyth on 23 October, on escort duties with the convoys heading to and from Narvik, in Norway. When the armed merchant cruiser  was attacked and sunk defending her convoy on 23 November, Edinburgh was among the flotilla detached to search for the German commerce raider, the battleship , responsible. However, the search was unsuccessful, and Edinburgh returned to escort duties.

On 18 March 1940, she arrived in the Tyne for a lengthy refit which lasted until 28 October. After these repairs, she was re-attached to the 18th Cruiser Squadron, and on 18 November left Faslane Naval Base, on the Clyde, escorting the troop convoy WS4B as far as Freetown (now Sierra Leone) before returning to Scapa Flow on 12 November. Shortly before Christmas, Edinburgh participated in a hunt for a German surface raider that had been reported as breaking out into the North Atlantic. After spending a week at sea, including Christmas Day, after the report turned out to be false, she returned to port on New Year's Eve.

During the winter of 1940, Edinburgh took part in several minor operations with the Home Fleet. She escorted convoy WS7 to the Middle East, returning to Scapa Flow on 15 April. She supported several mine-laying operations off the Danish coast, and supported Operation Claymore, the successful Allied raid on the German-occupied Lofoten Islands, on 4 May 1941.

She was on patrol in the Bay of Biscay, where she intercepted the German vessel  on 22 May 1941. Edinburgh was sent to intercept Bismarck on her projected course for Brest, and then shadow her, but Bismarck never reached that area.

On 1 June, she was sent to relieve the  light cruiser  on the Denmark Strait patrol route. After an uneventful assignment, she was ordered to cover another Middle East-bound convoy, WS 9B, and docked in Gibraltar again in early July. Later that month, Edinburgh took part in Operation Substance, arriving in Malta on 24 July. The next day, she had a close call when a German torpedo bomber attacked her. However, the ship sustained no damage, and continued on her course back to the Clyde.

In August 1941, Edinburgh escorted convoy WS10 to Simonstown, South Africa, and later sailed to Malta once more, this time as part of Operation Halberd, arriving at Malta on 28 September. She returned to Gibraltar shortly afterwards, departing from there on 1 October 1941, with supplies and prisoners of war aboard, and bound once more for the Clyde. After repairs at Faslane, she rejoined the Home Fleet on Iceland Forces Patrol during November.

In December 1941, she provided cover to Arctic convoys bringing aid to the Soviet Union.  From January 1942, she refitted in the Tyne, until 4 March, when she was once again placed on the Iceland-Faroes patrol.

She escorted two convoys to the Soviet Union (QP4 and PQ13), returning to Scapa Flow on 28 March. On 6 April, she left Scapa Flow to escort convoy PQ 14 to Murmansk. Of the 24 ships in PQ14, 16 were forced by unseasonal ice and bad weather to return to Iceland, and another was sunk by a U-boat. Edinburgh and the remaining seven vessels arrived in Murmansk on 19 April.

Sinking 

Edinburgh was the flagship of Rear-Admiral Stuart Bonham Carter, commanding the escort of returning Convoy QP 11: 17 ships which left Murmansk on 28 April 1942. On 30 April, the  fired a torpedo into her starboard side, hitting her just forward of the space in which the gold was stored.
The U-boat, on her fifth patrol, had been alerted to the convoy by German aerial reconnaissance. The ship began to list heavily, but the crew reacted quickly and competently by closing watertight bulkheads, which prevented the ship from sinking immediately. Soon after, U-456 put a second torpedo into Edinburghs stern, wrecking her steering equipment and crippling her. In anticipation of Edinburghs sinking, Stoker Francis James Dawson recovered her flag, later returning it to the Leith Museum in Edinburgh.

Along the way she was hounded constantly by German torpedo bombers.

Edinburgh cast off the tow, so that she started to sail in circles. Although her guns were in disarray, she fired on the attacking German ships. Edinburgh's second salvo hit Hermann Schoemann, leaving her in a sinking condition. Edinburghs escorts drove off Z24 and Z25, but she was struck by a torpedo that had missed another ship. The torpedo struck Edinburgh amidships, exactly opposite the first torpedo hit from U-456. She was now held together only by the deck plating and keel, which was likely to fail at any time, so the crew abandoned ship.  Gossamer took off 440 men and Harrier about 400. Two officers and 56 ratings were killed in the attacks. The vigorous action of the minesweepers led the Germans to mistake the power of the force they were facing.

Harrier tried to scuttle Edinburgh with 4 inch gunfire, but 20 shots did not sink her. Depth charges dropped alongside also failed. Finally, Foresight sank Edinburgh with her last torpedo (the others having been expended against the German destroyers), the torpedo being fired by David Loram (later to become Vice-Admiral Sir David Loram).

Gold salvage

On the return journey, Edinburgh was carrying  of gold bullion back to the UK. The consignment, which had a value of about £1.5 million sterling in 1942 (adjusted for inflation to 20 pounds, £224,200,863, was a partial payment by the USSR for the supplies of war material and military equipment from the Western Allies. In total the ship had 465 gold ingots in 93 wooden boxes stored in the bomb-room just aft of where the first torpedo - fired from U-456 - struck.

Nine years after the Second World War, the British government offered the salvage rights on Edinburgh to the British salvage company, Risdon Beazley Ltd., in 1954. However the project was put on hold due to strained political relations with the Soviet Union. In 1957, the wreck was designated as a war grave, which further complicated any recovery attempts because of the limitations in salvage techniques of the era.

In the late 1970s, the British government became increasingly anxious to recover the gold; not only because of its value but also because there was a growing concern that the wreck might be looted by unscrupulous salvagers or by the Soviet Union.

In the early 1980s, seasoned diver Keith Jessop's company Jessop Marine, with the full guidance and support of Wharton Williams Ltd – a leading global diving company, and OSA – a specialist shipping company, won a contract to attempt a recovery. Cutting into the wreck by divers was deemed more appropriate for a war grave than the traditional 'smash and grab' explosives-oriented methods. The consortium of specialist companies for the project was then formed: Wharton Williams as managers, OSA and Decca.  This group was contracted to Jessop Marine to attempt a recovery of the gold from the bomb room of the Edinburgh.

In April 1981, the OSA survey ship Dammtor, with Decca surveyors embarked under the direction of former Royal Naval Survey officer John Clarke, began searching for the wreck in the Barents Sea. Deploying a Scorpio ROV, Dammtor took detailed film of the wreck, which allowed Wharton Williams and OSA to evaluate a recovery project. The survival of her twin sister ship  lying in the Thames, permitted management and later the diving team to inspect and absorb the layout of the compartments surrounding the bomb room and, not least, the scale of the challenge in cutting into the ship 800 feet down in a hostile and remote location.

Later that year, on 30 August, the OSA dive-support vessel Stephaniturm steamed to the site from Peterhead, and the diving operation began in earnest under the leadership of former RN Clearance Diving Officer, Mike Stewart. On 15 September 1981, diver John Rossier found the first bar of gold. By 7 October, when bad weather finally forced the cessation of the diving operation, 431 of 465 ingots had been recovered. At the time the haul was worth in excess of £40,000,000 sterling (in 2020 worth around £140,000,000).This bullion recovery project created a World Record in deep diving which stands to this day.

A further 29 bars were brought up in 1986 by the Consortium, bringing the total to 460, leaving five unaccounted for.

Footnotes

References

External links 

HMS Edinburgh memorial site
 IWM Interview with survivor John Napier
 IWM Interview with survivor Edward Starkey

 

Town-class cruisers (1936)
Ships built by Swan Hunter
Ships built on the River Tyne
1938 ships
World War II cruisers of the United Kingdom
Shipwrecks in the Barents Sea
World War II shipwrecks in the Arctic Ocean
Soviet Union–United Kingdom relations
Maritime incidents in April 1942
Maritime incidents in May 1942
Ships sunk by German submarines in World War II